The 1986–87 Kansas Jayhawks men's basketball team represented the University of Kansas for the NCAA Division I men's intercollegiate basketball season of 1986–87. They were led by Larry Brown in his fourth season as head coach. The team played its home games in Allen Fieldhouse in Lawrence, Kansas.

Roster

Big Eight Conference standings

Schedule 

|-
!colspan=8| Regular season

|-
!colspan=8| Big 8 Tournament

|-
!colspan=8| NCAA Tournament

Rankings

References 

Kansas Jayhawks men's basketball seasons
Kansas
Kansas
Kansas Jay
Kansas Jay